Lessertia may refer to:
 Lessertia (plant), a flowering plants genus in the family Fabaceae
 Lessertia (spider), a spider genus in the family Linyphiidae